The exploding watermelon stunt or exploding watermelon challenge involves wrapping rubber bands around a watermelon until the pressure of the rubber bands causes the watermelon to explode in a dramatic or spectacular fashion. Though previous video iterations of the event have proved popular, on April 8, 2016, the website BuzzFeed streamed the stunt live on Facebook.

BuzzFeed event

The event began around 3 pm (Eastern United States time). During the 45-minute stream, the event peaked at over 800,000 live watchers, and the resulting video of the event garnered millions of views. The event was parodied a few days later on The Tonight Show; that show had attempted the stunt in September 2015 with Olivia Wilde but cut the segment short as it was taking too long.

The event generated discussion of the future of journalism where trivial events can garner significant attention.Castillo, Michelle (8 April 2006). The future of TV: 800K watch a watermelon explode, CNBC

Challenge origin
The concept of putting rubber bands around a watermelon until it explodes first became popular on the internet as early as at least July 2012, when the stunt was filmed by The Slow Mo Guys with a very high frame-rate camera, but earlier videos date back at least to 2008.

References

See also
 List of Internet phenomena

Challenges
BuzzFeed
Watermelons